Mary Lambie is a New Zealand media personality and journalist.

Career 
Mary Lambie was presenter of the Good Morning show for seven years from 1997 to 2003. She resigned from Good Morning when production moved from Auckland to Wellington. She then purchased and managed a Subway franchise. She subsequently started her own online reputation management company, Socius. She is married to RNZ broadcaster Jim Mora and lives in Auckland. In 2008 Mora and Lambie related their experience of their daughter's illness from an immune disorder.

See also
List of New Zealand television personalities

References

External links 
 Mary Lambie, Presenter: NZOnScreen

Living people
New Zealand journalists
Year of birth missing (living people)